Amabile may refer to:
 John Amabile (disambiguation)
Sweetness of wine
The Amabile Choirs of London, Canada, a family of choirs
A musical direction